John Arnott was a Scottish amateur football outside forward who played in the Scottish League for Queen's Park. He was capped by Scotland at amateur level.

References 

Year of birth missing
Place of birth missing
Association football outside forwards
Scottish footballers
Queen's Park F.C. players
Scottish Football League players
Scotland amateur international footballers